
Christ the King, of Vũng Tàu is a statue of Jesus, standing on Mount Nhỏ in Vũng Tàu, Bà Rịa–Vũng Tàu province, Đông Nam Bộ, Vietnam. The Vietnamese Catholic Church built the statue in 1974 and it was completed in 2 December 1994 

There is a 133-step staircase inside the statue.

The statue is the largest Christian statue across Asia since 2012, and since its restoration of 1993, it has been a major pilgrim destination for Christians across Vietnam as well as Christian vacationers.

See also 
List of statues of Jesus
List of tallest statues

References

External links 
GIANT CHRIST STATUE
Giant Jesus Christ Statue In Vung Tau City
Jesus Christ Statue, Vung Tau, Vietnam

Mountain monuments and memorials
Monuments and memorials in Vietnam
V
Cultural infrastructure completed in 1993
Buildings and structures in Bà Rịa-Vũng Tàu province
Catholic Church in Vietnam